Gulnare might refer to:

Gulnare, Colorado
Gulnare, South Australia